The African Aerospace and Defence Expo (AAD) is an aerospace and defence exhibition held every two years at AFB Waterkloof, in Centurion, Gauteng, South Africa. The exhibition combines a trade exhibition and an air show. 

The AAD began in 1975 when the South African based aviation magazine World Airnews determined that a professional aerospace exhibition was appropriate, as distinguished from the traveling "barnstorming" air shows that were then prominent.

The first event was held October 1975 as "Aviation Africa", at Lanseria Airport near Johannesburg, South Africa under the sponsorship of the Commercial Aviation Association of Southern Africa. The same year, Lt. General Bob Rogers of the South African Air Force instituted an open day at AFB Waterkloof, in Centurion, which eventually turned into the Defence Exhibition of South Africa (DEXSA).

In 2000, Aviation Africa and DEXSA combined to become AAD. In 2006, the exhibition moved to AFB Ysterplaat in Cape Town. It returned to AFB Waterkloof in 2012.

The next AAD is scheduled for 18-22 September 2024.

References

External links

 

Arms fairs
Air shows
Trade fairs in South Africa
Aviation in South Africa
1975 establishments in South Africa
Recurring events established in 1975
Biennial events